Zayanderud (from   "fertile" or "life giver", and   "river"), also spelled as Zayandeh-Rood or Zayanderood, is the largest river of the Iranian Plateau in central Iran.

Geography
The Zayandeh starts in the Zard-Kuh subrange of the Zagros Mountains in Chaharmahal and Bakhtiari Province. It flows  eastward before ending in the Gavkhouni swamp, a seasonal salt lake, southeast of Isfahan (Esfahan) city.

The Zayandeh used to have significant flow all year long, unlike many of Iran's rivers which are seasonal, but today runs dry due to water extraction before reaching the city of Esfahan. In the early 2010s, the lower reaches of the river dried out completely after several years of seasonal dry-outs.

Zayandeh River water gave life to the people of central Iran mainly in Isfahan and Yazd provinces. Before the drying-out, water diverted per person was 240 litres (63 US gallons/53 imp gallons) per day in urban areas and 150 litres (40 US gallons/33 imp gallons) per day in villages.

History
People have lived on the banks of Zayandeh River for thousands of years. The earliest evidence of human occupation along the River is found in a cave site called Qaleh Bozi near Dizicheh at SW of Isfahan. More than 40,000 years ago, groups of Paleolithic hunters (Neanderthals) used Qaleh Bozi caves as shelter for seasonal or temporary occupations and left their stone tools and bones of hunted animals. 
An ancient prehistoric culture, the Zayandeh River Civilization,  flourished along the banks of the Zayandeh in the 6th Millennium BC.

Zayandeh River crosses the city of Isfahan, a major cultural and economic center of Iran.  In the 17th century, Shaikh Bahai (an influential scholar and adviser to the Safavid dynasty), designed and built a system of canals (maadi), to distribute Zayandeh water to Isfahan's suburbs. Water from the Zayandeh River helped the growth of the population and the economy, helped establish Isfahan as an influential center, and gave a green landscape to Isfahan, a city in the middle of a desert.

The Zayandeh river bed is spanned by many historical Safavid era bridges, and the river used to flow through many parks.

American archaeologists and historians of Persian art, Arthur Upham Pope and his wife Phyllis Ackerman are buried in a small mausoleum on the river bank. Richard N. Frye (an American scholar of Iranian and Central Asian Studies) has also requested to be buried there.

Water use and division

Until the 1960s in Isfahan Province the distribution of water followed the Tomar, a document claimed to date from the 16th Century. The Tomar divided the flow of the Zayandeh River into 33 parts which were then specifically allotted to the eight major districts within the region. At the district level the water flow was divided either on a time basis, or by the use of variable weirs, so that the proportion could be maintained regardless of the height of the flow.

For centuries Isfahan city had been an oasis settlement, noted for its surrounding fertile lands and prosperity. Until the 1960s industrial demand for water was minimal, which enabled the scarce water resources to be utilized primarily for agriculture. With a growing population within the basin, and rising standards of living particularly within the city, the pressure on water resources steadily increased until the division of water Tomar was no longer feasible. The creation of large steel works and other new industries demanded water.

The Chadegan Reservoir dam project in 1972 was a major hydroelectric project to help with stabilizing water flow and generating electricity.  The dam was initially named Shah Abbas Dam after Shah Abbas I, the most influential king of the Safavid dynasty, but it was changed to Zayandeh Dam after the Islamic revolution in 1979. Since 1972, the Chadegan Reservoir has helped prevent seasonal flooding of the Zayandeh River. Water discharge is increased during Persian New Year to allow the river to flow through Esfahan once more during the public holiday.

80% of the Zayandeh's extracted water is used for agriculture, 10% for human consumption (drinking and domestic needs of a population of 4.5 million), 7% for industry (like the Zobahan-e-Esfahan and Foolad Mobarekeh steel companies and Isfahan's petrochemical, refinery and power plants) and 3% for other uses. There have been a number of tunnel projects (Koohrang) to redirect water from the Karun River (Iran's largest river that also starts in the Zagros Mountains), to the Zayandeh. These have helped provide water for the growing population and new industries in both Isfahan and Yazd provinces.

While the drying-out of the lower reaches of the Zayandeh River has been attributed to drought, the main reasons are man-made. Poor planning and populist politics have led to years of mismanagement and overuse which resulted in seasonal dry-outs and ultimately caused the river to dry out completely before reaching Isfahan.

Bridges

There are several new and old bridges (pol) over the Zayandeh River. The oldest, Shahrestan, built in the 5th century AD, is still in use as a pedestrian crossing in Sharestan village.

Bridges on Zayandeh River in City of Esfahan:

Recreation
In the section of the Zayandeh River crossing Esfahan, bridges, parks, paddle boats and traditional cafes and restaurants amongst the rest of Esfahan rich cultural heritage, are major tourist attractions for Iranian as well as international visitors.

References

Further reading

External links

Rivers of Isfahan Province
Rivers of Chaharmahal and Bakhtiari province
Landforms of Chaharmahal and Bakhtiari Province
Landforms of Isfahan Province
Isfahan
Endorheic basins of Asia
Ramsar sites in Iran
Former rivers